Planet Earth Live is a live-action nature documentary screened on British television. Produced by the BBC Natural History Unit and broadcast in May 2012, the programme was presented by Richard Hammond and Julia Bradbury.

Format
Planet Earth Live featured real-time footage of young animals from five continents throughout the month of May. Broadcast three times per week, teams of nature experts and documentary makers monitored the activity of animals in their area, reporting back on the day's events. Animals featured included meerkats in the Kalahari Desert, American black bears in Minnesota, lions and African bush elephants in East Africa, toque macaques in Sri Lanka, gray whales off the coast of California, polar bears in Svalbard and giant otters in Peru.

The programme was shown in May 2012 on BBC One in the United Kingdom and was broadcast in 140 countries in total, making it the most ambitious global wildlife series the BBC had ever undertaken. In the US it was retitled 24/7 Wild and aired on NatGeo Wild; in South Africa, Asia, Australia, Italy, Nordic countries, New Zealand and Poland it was shown on BBC Knowledge; and in India on BBC Entertainment.

Ratings

Critical reception
The show was criticised for the lack of live coverage, with many of the animal scenes having been pre-recorded. There were also mixed reviews with regard to the style of presenters. Some of the viewers praised the choice of Richard Hammond and Julia Bradbury, as fresh and put across the facts in an easy to understand way, whereas others felt that the presenters were not wildlife experts, were out of their depth and inappropriate for this genre. BBC meanwhile, claim that the show has a huge viewership and only a relatively small number of complaints.

References

External links
 
 

BBC television documentaries
BBC high definition shows
2010s British documentary television series
2012 British television series debuts
2012 British television series endings
English-language television shows
Planet Earth (franchise)